Gene Mack (born February 25, 1949) is a Canadian football player who played professionally for the Toronto Argonauts and Hamilton Tiger-Cats.

References

1949 births
Living people
Toronto Argonauts players